Gabrielle Donnay, née Hamburger (21 March 1920 – 4 April 1987), was a German-born American crystallographer and historian of science.

Life
Gabrielle Donnay was born in Landeshut, Germany (now Kamienna Góra, Poland) on 21 March 1920 and emigrated to the United States in 1937. She received her B.A. from UCLA with highest honors in chemistry in 1941 and was awarded her Ph.D in 1949 from MIT. She then went to work for Carnegie Institution of Washington where she met and married Jose Donnay that same year. When he retired from Johns Hopkins in 1970, she was hired as a faculty member by McGill University in Canada.

Activities
Donnay published Laboratory Manual in Crystallography based on her classes at McGill and Women in the Geological Sciences in Canada to correct the injustices that she perceived in the male-dominated field of geology. She was awarded the Past Presidents’ Medal of the Mineralogical Association of Canada in 1983. She and her husband frequently collaborated and they published two editions of "Crystal Data" in 1954 and 1963 to compile the research of all crystallographers. "Gabrielle Donnay’s area of expertise was in crystal chemistry and structural crystallography and Jose Donnay’s in the topological and morphological aspects of the structures. She worked on tourmaline and was especially interested in the relationship between the physical properties of a mineral and its structure. She published more than 134 papers in her lifetime, almost half of which were collaborative projects with her husband. Donnay showed great insight into the various chemical mechanisms that were important in the growth of crystals." She died on 4 April 1987.

Notes

References

1920 births
1987 deaths
University of California, Los Angeles alumni
Massachusetts Institute of Technology alumni
Academic staff of McGill University
German emigrants to the United States
Johns Hopkins University faculty
American expatriates in Canada